Cropp (formerly: Cropp Town) is a clothing brand and retailer chain, owned by the LPP, that is specialized in the streetwear style of clothing. Its headquarters are located in Gdańsk, Poland. In 2021, company owned 356 stores in Europe, located in 17 countries, including 170 stores in Poland, and 186 in other countries. Additionally, it operated online retail in 13 countries. It was established in 2004.

Stores 
In 2021, the company owned 356 stores in Europe, located in 17 countries, including 170 stores in Poland, and 186 in other countries such as Belarus, Bosnia and Herzegovina, Bulgaria, Croatia, Czech Republic, Estonia, Finland, Hungary, Kazakhstan, Latvia, Lithuania, Poland, Romania, Russia, Serbia, Slovakia, Slovenia, and Ukraine. Additionally, it operated online retail in 13 countries (Croatia, Czech Republic, Estonia, Germany, Hungary, Latvia, Lithuania, Poland, Romania, Russia, Slovakia, Slovenia, and Ukraine).

In 2022, following the Russian invasion of Ukraine, the company had withdrawn its activity from Ukraine.

Gallery

References

External links 
 Official website

Retail companies of Poland
Multinational companies headquartered in Poland
Clothing companies of Poland
Polish brands
Clothing brands
Companies based in Gdańsk
Polish companies established in 2004
Street fashion